Nadia Dandolo (born 11 September 1962) is a former Italian long-distance runner, two-time it the top eight at European Championships (1990, 1992) and one at the European Indoor Championships (1991).

Biography
She won the silver medal in the 3000 metres at the 1991 Mediterranean Games. She competed at the IAAF World Cross Country Championships on six occasions, finishing in fifth place at the 1990 and 1992 editions. Her ninth-place finish at the 1982 competition in Rome earned her the women's team silver medal. She also won the Cinque Mulini cross country race in 1990.

She has continued running into the Masters division, winning the W50 5000 metres at the 2015 World Masters Athletics Championships, in a time superior to the winners in all three younger divisions (for women almost 18 years younger).

Personal bests

Achievements
Senior

Masters

National titles
Dandolo won four national championships at individual senior level.
Italian Athletics Championships
3000 m: 1991 (1)
Italian Cross Country Championships
Long race: 1990, 1991, 1992 (3)

See also
 Italian team at the running events
 Italian all-time top lists - 3000 metres
 Italian all-time top lists - 5000 metres
 Italian all-time top lists - 10000 metres
 List of Italian records in masters athletics

References

External links
 

1962 births
Living people
Italian female long-distance runners
Italian female cross country runners
Italian masters athletes
Mediterranean Games silver medalists for Italy
Athletes (track and field) at the 1991 Mediterranean Games
Mediterranean Games medalists in athletics